Nenad Nerandžić (born 19 June 1996) is a Serbian professional basketball player for Igokea of the ABA League.

Playing career 
Nerandžić played for Beovuk 72, Metalac, and Borac Čačak, all of the Serbian League.

On 12 June 2021, Nerandžić signed a two-year contract with FMP. In December 2022, he signed with Igokea for the rest of the 2022–23 season.

References

External links 
 Player Profile at eurobasket.com
 Player Profile at realgm.com
 Player Profile at proballers.com

1996 births
Living people
ABA League players
Basketball players from Belgrade
Basketball League of Serbia players
KK Beovuk 72 players
KK Borac Čačak players
KK FMP players
KK Igokea players
KK Metalac Valjevo players
Power forwards (basketball)
Serbian expatriate basketball people in Bosnia and Herzegovina
Serbian men's basketball players
Small forwards